Daytona Beach Islanders was a name for various minor league baseball teams that have all played in the Florida State League from 1920–1966 and in 1977 and again from 1985–1986. In 1968 through 1973, the team became the Daytona Beach Dodgers, due to their affiliation with the Los Angeles Dodgers. In 1977, the team once again took up the Islanders name before becoming the Daytona Beach Astros for the next seven seasons. Then, for the 1985 and 1986 seasons, they were, yet again, known as the Daytona Beach Islanders, playing as a co-op club of the Baltimore Orioles and Texas Rangers for the first of those years and as a full affiliate of the Rangers for the 1986 season. Finally the team became the Daytona Beach Admirals (and was a Chicago White Sox affiliate) in 1987, before being sold and becoming the St. Lucie Mets.

History

Islanders
The first team known as the Daytona Islanders team was an independent team that played from 1920–1924. Partway through the 1924 season, they moved to Clearwater, Florida to become the Clearwater Pelicans. The second team was an affiliate of the St. Louis Cardinals (1936–1938, 1940–41) and  Brooklyn Dodgers (1939). While the Islanders were an affiliate of the Cardinals, Stan Musial played for them under manager Dickey Kerr. The third team played from 1946–1966 as an affiliate of the Brooklyn Dodgers (1946), Cleveland Indians (1950–53, 55–56), St. Louis Cardinals (1954, 57–60), Chicago White Sox (1961), Kansas City A's (1962–64) and Detroit Tigers (1965–66).

Dodgers
In 1968, the team became the Daytona Beach Dodgers, Single-A affiliate of the Los Angeles Dodgers and continued to play their games in the Florida State League until 1973.

Astros
After a hiatus in 1977, the team was once again named the Islanders, before becoming the Daytona Beach Astros the following year, as an affiliate with the Houston Astros. After 1984, the Astros moved the team to Kissimmee, Florida and they became the Osceola Astros.

Admirals
A team known as the Admirals moved back into Daytona Beach and played for one season, before moving to St. Lucie and becoming the St. Lucie Mets.

Notable alumni

Admirals

John Barfield
Tom Drees
Wayne Edwards
Buddy Groom
Matt Merullo
Bob Milacki
Francisco Oliveras
Allan Ramirez
Billy Ripken
Kenny Rogers
Jeff Tackett

Astros

Ricky Adams
Rod Boxberger
Eric Bullock
Jeff Calhoun
Jeff Datz
Glenn Davis
Bill Doran
Danny Heep
Pedro Hernández
Chris Jones
Mark Knudson
Doug Phifer
Doug Konieczny
Jack Lazorko
Scott Loucks
Louie Meadows
Ron Meridith
John Mizerock
Pat Perry
Johnny Ray
Larry Ray
J. R. Richard
Mark Ross
Roger Samuels
Brent Strom
Tim Tolman
Tony Walker
Robbie Wine

Dodgers

Doyle Alexander
Iván DeJesús
Joe Ferguson
Davey Lopes
Rick Rhoden
Jerry Royster
Bob Shaw
Steve Yeager
Geoff Zahn

Islanders

Red Ames
Bill Antonello
Lou Bevil
Roy Branch
Steve Busby
Bill Butler
Les Cain
Bert Campaneris
Rocky Colavito
Wayland Dean
Bobby Dews
Chuck Diering
Blix Donnelly
Dick Drago
Dave Duncan
Craig Eaton
Danny Garcia
Hank Gornicki
Tom Harrison
Kelly Heath
Mike Jones
Mike Kilkenny
Marcel Lachemann
Gene Lamont
Tony LaRussa
Allan Lewis
Renie Martin
Félix Millán
Ed Olivares
Ken Phelps
Ellie Rodríguez
Joe Rudi
Ron Taylor
Johnny Vander Meer
Jon Warden

Pelicans
Tommy McMillan
Herb Thomas

References

External links
Baseball Reference
Daytona Beach baseball history

Baseball teams established in 1920
Baseball teams disestablished in 1987
Defunct Florida State League teams
Detroit Tigers minor league affiliates
Cleveland Guardians minor league affiliates
Kansas City Athletics minor league affiliates
St. Louis Cardinals minor league affiliates
Brooklyn Dodgers minor league affiliates
Los Angeles Dodgers minor league affiliates
Houston Astros minor league affiliates
Kansas City Royals minor league affiliates
Texas Rangers minor league affiliates
Chicago White Sox minor league affiliates
Defunct minor league baseball teams
Defunct baseball teams in Florida
1920 establishments in Florida
1987 disestablishments in Florida